Michael John Murphy (born September 12, 1950) is a Canadian former professional ice hockey player who played in the National Hockey League for 13 years for the St. Louis Blues, New York Rangers and the Los Angeles Kings and has been Assistant and Head Coach in the NHL for The Los Angeles Kings, Ottawa Senators, Vancouver Canucks, Toronto Maple Leafs and the New York Rangers. Murphy also played for Team Canada winning a Bronze Medal in 1978 and Coached Team Canada, International Hockey League (IHL). Murphy is presently Senior Vice President of the NHL, hockey operations.

Playing career
As a youth, he and teammate Peter Sullivan played in the 1963 Quebec International Pee-Wee Hockey Tournament with a minor ice hockey from North York.

In the National Hockey League, he played for the St. Louis Blues, New York Rangers, Los Angeles Kings. Murphy was captain of the Los Angeles Kings for 7 years and played in Los Angeles for 13 years. He played for Team Canada (bronze medal winner) and was assistant coach for Team Canada. Murphy was selected to play on the NHL All Star team in 1980. He has career totals in the NHL of 231 goals, 318 assists for 556 total points in 831 games played.

In 2016, Murphy was inducted into the Aurora Sports Hall of Fame (aurorashof.ca) in the category of Athlete/Hockey.

Click on the link to watch Murphy’s induction ceremony and video documentary. 
https://aurorashof.ca/inductee/michael-murph-murphy/

Coaching career
Upon retiring from hockey with the Los Angeles Kings, he became their head coach. Murphy went on to be Assistant coach of the Vancouver Canucks, Ottawa Senators, and New York Rangers. Murphy was promoted from assistant coach of the Vancouver Canucks to head coach of their farm team, the Milwaukee Admirals of the American Hockey League (AHL). Murphy left Milwaukee for an assistant coach position with the Toronto Maple Leafs hockey team. Murphy was then promoted to be the 24th head coach of the Toronto Maple Leafs.

NHL vice-president
As NHL vice-president of hockey operations, Murphy was forced to make a tough call during game three of the first round of the 2010 Stanley Cup. Murphy disallowed what was first ruled as a 3-4 goal on the ice for the Vancouver Canucks against Murphy's former team, the Los Angeles Kings. The incident is one of many that has called for greater NHL transparency from the public. The official ruling stated that, "Video Review was used to determine whether the puck was kicked into the net by Vancouver's Daniel Sedin with a kicking motion. Upon review, it was determined that the puck was propelled into the net by a kicking motion. This was not a deflection. The direction the puck was moving and the force of the skate were the determining factors in concluding 'no goal'". According to rule 49.2 of the NHL, "A puck that is directed into the net by an attacking player’s skate shall be a legitimate goal as long as no distinct kicking motion is evident." Later, in an interview with CBC Hockey Night in Canada, Murphy admitted that the puck was not kicked in a "distinct kicking motion", as the official NHL rules require, yet Murphy maintained his position on the judgement.

Career statistics

Regular season and playoffs

Coaching record

References

External links

1950 births
Living people
Canadian ice hockey forwards
Los Angeles Kings coaches
Los Angeles Kings players
New York Rangers coaches
New York Rangers draft picks
New York Rangers players
Ottawa Senators coaches
Ice hockey people from Toronto
St. Louis Blues players
Toronto Maple Leafs coaches
Toronto Marlboros players
Vancouver Canucks coaches
Canadian ice hockey coaches